The White Shadow, also known as White Shadows in the United States, is a 1923 British drama film directed by Graham Cutts and starring Betty Compson, Clive Brook, and Henry Victor.

Plot
The plot concerns twin sisters, one who is modest and socially conservative, the other a free spirit who cannot bear the constrictions of a traditional life. Their father's unhappiness over his bohemian daughter's lifestyle leads him to drink and dissolution. The sisters end up having the same man, Robin, in love with them, without him realizing they are two different people. The extant film ends at a most critical juncture, at which both sisters, Robin, and the father meet at a Paris boîte and are about to realize who each other is. There are several multiple exposures when the two sisters, both played by Betty Compson, are on screen at once.

Cast
 Betty Compson as Nancy Brent / Georgina Brent
 Clive Brook as Robin Field
 Henry Victor as Louis Chadwick
 A. B. Imeson as Mr. Brent
 Olaf Hytten as Herbert Barnes
 Daisy Campbell as Elizabeth Brent

Production
The film is based on the unpublished novel Children of Chance by Michael Morton. Alfred Hitchcock collaborated with Cutts on the film. Cutts and Hitchcock made the film quickly, as they wanted to make use of Betty Compson, who had appeared in their hit Woman to Woman (also 1923), before she returned to the United States.

The film was made at the Balcon, Freedman and Saville studio in Hoxton, London.

Writing about the film in 1969, producer Michael Balcon said:
"Engrossed in our first production [Woman to Woman], we had made no preparations for the second. Caught on the hop, we rushed into production with a story called The White Shadow. It was as big a flop as Woman to Woman had been a success."

Preservation status
Long thought to have been a completely lost film, a New Zealand projectionist, Jack Murtagh, had salvaged some of the film. In 1989, Tony Osborne, Murtagh's grandson, donated the tinted nitrate prints, and other film cans to the New Zealand Film Archive.

On 3 August 2011, the New Zealand Film Archive announced that the film "turned up among a cache of unidentified American nitrate prints held in the archive for the last 23 years". One film can was mislabeled Two Sisters, while the other simply stated Unidentified American Film. Only later were they identified.

In 2012, The White Shadow was preserved by Park Road Post Production, Wellington,  New Zealand, with support from the New Zealand Film Archive and the Academy of Motion Picture Arts and Sciences.
 
In 2013, it was released on a 198-minute DVD by the National Film Preservation Foundation, with six other films and seven shorts.

Further viewing

Bibliography
Rachael Low: The History of British Film: Volume IV, 1918–1929 (Routledge, 1997)

References

External links
 
 
 The White Shadow at SilentEra
 The White Shadow at Brenton film
 The White Shadow at Jazz Age Club
 
 Film clip at National Film Preservation Foundation
 The White Shadow collections at British Film Institute

1923 films
1923 drama films
British black-and-white films
Films directed by Graham Cutts
British silent feature films
British films based on plays
Films directed by Alfred Hitchcock
British drama films
1920s rediscovered films
Films produced by Victor Saville
Films about twin sisters
Rediscovered British films
Films shot in London
1920s British films
Silent drama films